Andrea Lauren Gibbs is an Australian comedian, actress and radio presenter. She presents Weekends with Andrea Gibbs on ABC Local Radio.

Early life 
She spent her childhood on a family farm in the small country town of Donnybrook, Western Australia. She attended Donnybrook District High School and Bunbury Senior High School.  In 1999 she moved to Perth, Western Australia, where she attended Curtin University of Technology, completing a Bachelor of Arts English.

Career 
After studying Gibbs went overseas, and worked with the Edinburgh Festival. Returning to Australia in 2001, she joined improvising comedy troupe The Big HOO HAA!.  In 2004, she entered Triple J’s Raw Comedy competition performing stand-up for the first time. She became a National Finalist the following year and performed at the Melbourne International Comedy Festival in 2005. In 2006 she was handpicked by the Melbourne International Comedy Festival talent scouts to perform in The Comedy Zone, a showcase of Australian comedy’s hottest new comics.

Late 2005 started her career in broadcasting after she was headhunted by Southern Cross Broadcasting to co-host 96fm’s Breakfast Show, one of WA's highest rating breakfast shows.  She has continued to work in radio with ABC and now hosts her own program Weekends with Andrea Gibbs.

As an actor, her television credits include Very Small Business (ABCTV), Stepmonsters (Nickelodeon) and Hug The Sun.  Film credits include How to Please a Woman by Renée Webster, 'Three Summers' by Ben Elton, My Year Without Sex, written and directed by Sarah Watts, and multiple shorts.

In 2014 she toured with Griffin Theatre Company and Perth Theatre Company's production of Eight Gigabytes of Hardcore Pornography by Declan Greene, and was called "a revelation" by The Australian.

As a producer she is the creative head behind Barefaced Stories, launching the Think Back Stack in 2018 and The Chin Wagon in 2019. She spoke at TEDxPERTH about the "Power of Storytelling".
She acted on stage in Minneapolis by Will O'Mahony and Van Badham's adaptation of Animal Farm by George Orwell for Black Swan State Theatre Company. Her first play, Barracking for the Umpire, is in production for the 2022 Black Swan State Theatre Company season. 

Andrea is  the host of Weekends with Andrea Gibbs on ABC Radio Australia-wide, the co-creator of Barefaced Stories.

References

External links 
  
 The Big HOO HAA!

1977 births
Australian women comedians
Living people
People from Donnybrook, Western Australia